The  was a Japanese domain of the Edo period, and the only domain located in Yamashiro Province. Its castle was located within modern-day Fushimi, Kyoto.

The strategic location of the castle figured in the 1582 Battle of Yamazaki.

During the 1868 Battle of Toba–Fushimi, the master of Yodo changed his allegiance from the Shogunate to Imperial forces, going as far as closing his gate and refusing protection to the retreating army of the shōgun Tokugawa Yoshinobu.

List of lords
Matsudaira (Hisamatsu) clan (Shinpan; 35,000 koku)

Sadatsuna

Nagai clan (Fudai; 100,000→736,000 koku)

Naomasa
Naoyuki

Ishikawa clan (Fudai; 60,000 koku)

Noriyuki
Yoshitaka
Fusayoshi

Matsudaira (Toda) clan (Fudai; 60,000 koku)

Mitsuhiro
Mitsuchika

Matsudaira (Ogyū) clan (Fudai; 60,00 koku)

Norisato

Inaba clan (Fudai; 102,000 koku)

Masatomo
Masatō
Masatsune
Masachika
Masayoshi
Masahiro
Masanobu
Masanari
Masaharu
Masamori
Masayoshi
Masakuni

References

 Yodo on "Edo 300 HTML" (30 September 2007)

Domains of Japan
Hisamatsu-Matsudaira clan
Inaba clan
Ogyū-Matsudaira clan
Toda-Matsudaira clan